The Continental Shelf Act 1964 (c. 29) is a UK Act of Parliament that governs drilling for oil on the continental shelf around the British Isles. It extended the land regime to areas outside UK territorial waters, where international law recognised the UK right to the seabed, subsoil and natural resources.

Contents
The following is a summary of key provisions of the Act. 

s 1(1) ‘Any rights exercisable by the United Kingdom outside territorial waters with respect to the sea bed and subsoil and their natural resources, except so far as they are exercisable in relation to coal, are hereby vested in Her Majesty.’(3) key licensing provisions from the 1934 Act to the continental shelf (6) duty of SS for ‘effective and co-ordinated development of such resources’ in s 1(1) of Ministry of Fuel and Power Act 1945 extends to resources outside GB. (7) can make Orders. 
s 7, radioactive substances under Environmental Permitting (England and Wales) Regulations 2016 (S.I. 2016/1154) and PA 1998 s 11. 
s 8, submarine cables, if damaged, lead to punishment in the same way as under the Submarine Telegraph Act 1885 s 3. (1A) reference to sub-marine and cable pipe lines is defined in s 41(3) of the Marine and Coastal Access Act 2009 (exclusive economic zone).
s 9 (repealed) contained a power of the Gas Board (then British Gas) to purchase at a reasonable price, all natural gas first. 
s 11(1) proceedings for offences can be taken in the UK (2) ‘Where a body corporate is guilty of such an offence and the offence is proved to have been committed with the consent or connivance of, or to be attributable to any neglect on the part of, any director, manager, secretary or other similar officer of the body corporate or any person who was purporting to act in any such capacity he, as well as the body corporate, shall be guilty of the offence and shall be liable to be proceeded against and punished accordingly. In this subsection, "director" in relation to a body corporate established for the purpose of carrying on under national ownership any industry or part of an industry or undertaking, being a body corporate whose affairs are managed by its members, means a member of that body corporate.’

See also
UK enterprise law
Oil and gas in the UK

Notes

United Kingdom enterprise law
United Kingdom Acts of Parliament 1964